The Stillwater River is a tributary of the Yellowstone River. Approximately 70 miles (113 km) long, it runs through southern Montana in the United States. The Stillwater River has also been known as: the Itchkeppearja River, Rose River, Rosebud River and Stillwater Creek.

The river was affected by the 2022 Montana floods.

General
The Stillwater River rises in the Absaroka-Beartooth Wilderness south of the Beartooth Mountains in southern Park County, near the state line with Wyoming and the boundary of Yellowstone National Park. It flows northeast, between the Absaroka Range to the west and the Beartooth Mountains to the east, through Custer National Forest, past Nye and Absarokee. It joins the Yellowstone near Columbus, Montana.

Fishing
This Stillwater is a Blue Ribbon fishery. Trout are the primary game fish, but Mountain Whitefish are also common. In the river's lower sections, Rainbow Trout and Brown Trout are the most common, but towards the headwaters Yellowstone Cutthroat Trout and Brook Trout show up with increased frequency. In the spring Rainbow Trout from the Yellowstone River enter the Stillwater to spawn, some traveling as far upstream as Nye. In the fall, Brown Trout also enter the river from the Yellowstone to spawn. It is during these seasons that larger fish up to 5 pounds can be more easily found.  The Stillwater is often overlooked, but is one of Montana's greatest fisheries.

Despite its misleading name, the Stillwater's most popular stretches contain class II and III whitewater. While float fishing from a raft is a common way to fish the river, it is recommended that only experienced rowers attempt to navigate it.

See also

List of rivers of Montana
Montana Stream Access Law

Notes

Rivers of Montana
Rivers of Park County, Montana
Bodies of water of Stillwater County, Montana
Tributaries of the Yellowstone River